Mayumi Yamamoto (山本真由美 Yamamoto Mayumi; born May 11, 1984) is a Japanese actress.

Filmography

Television
Kanjani Knight (Guest appearance)
幽霊(ゴースト)ママ (Regular cast member)
新・京都迷宮案内
てるてる家族 (Teruteru Kazoku)
GET01 (Regular cast member)
エンタメニュースショー　GET (Entamenyuusushou)
おしえて (Oshiete)

Feature films
Ashita wa Kitto... (2001)
Anata ni Fusawashii (2020)

External links
(in Japanese)

1984 births
Living people
Japanese actresses